Ann Shola Orloff (born 1953) is an American sociologist, specializing in Comparative-Historical Sociology, Gender and Social Inequalities, Sociological Theory and Political Sociology. She is a Professor of Sociology and Political Science and Board of Lady Managers of the Columbian Exposition Chair at Northwestern University. She is also editor of Social Politics, published by Oxford University Press, which she co-founded with Barbara Hobson (Stockholm University) in 1994.

She obtained a B.A. from Harvard University in 1975 and a Ph.D. from Princeton University in 1985. She has been a visiting professor at the European University Institute, Sciences Po in Paris and the Australian National University.

Her books include Remaking Modernity: Politics, History and Sociology (co-editor with Julia Adams and Elisabeth Clemens; Duke, 2005) and States, Markets, Families: Gender, Liberalism and Social Policy in Australia, Canada, Great Britain and the United States (with Julia O'Connor and Sheila Shaver; Cambridge, 1999).

References

American sociologists
American women sociologists
Living people
Harvard University alumni
Princeton University alumni
Northwestern University faculty
1953 births
21st-century American women